Kontorka is a rural locality (a settlement) in Ilezskoye Rural Settlement, Tarnogsky District, Vologda Oblast, Russia. The population was 281 as of 2002. There are 6 streets.

Geography 
Kontorka is located 58 km northeast of Tarnogsky Gorodok (the district's administrative centre) by road.

References 

Rural localities in Tarnogsky District